An anti-pattern in software engineering, project management, and business processes is a common response to a recurring problem that is usually ineffective and risks being highly counterproductive. The term, coined in 1995 by computer programmer Andrew Koenig, was inspired by the book Design Patterns (which highlights a number of design patterns in software development that its authors considered to be highly reliable and effective) and first published in his article in the Journal of Object-Oriented Programming.
A further paper in 1996 presented by Michael Ackroyd at the Object World West Conference also documented anti-patterns.

It was, however, the 1998 book AntiPatterns that both popularized the idea and extended its scope beyond the field of software design to include software architecture and project management.
Other authors have extended it further since to encompass environmental/organizational/cultural anti-patterns.

Definition 
According to the authors of Design Patterns, there are two key elements to an anti-pattern that distinguish it from a bad habit, bad practice, or bad idea:

 The anti-pattern is a commonly-used process, structure or pattern of action that, despite initially appearing to be an appropriate and effective response to a problem, has more bad consequences than good ones.
 Another solution exists to the problem the anti-pattern is attempting to address. This solution is documented, repeatable, and proven to be effective where the anti-pattern is not.

A guide to what is commonly used is a "rule-of-three" similar to that for patterns: to be an anti-pattern it must have been witnessed occurring at least three times.

Uses 
Documenting anti-patterns can be an effective way to analyze a problem space and to capture expert knowledge.

While some anti-pattern descriptions merely document the adverse consequences of the pattern, good anti-pattern documentation also provides an alternative, or a means to ameliorate the anti-pattern.

Software engineering anti-patterns 
In software engineering, anti-patterns include the big ball of mud (lack of) design; the God Class (where a single class handles all control in a program rather than control being distributed across multiple classes); and Poltergeists (ephemeral controller classes that only exist to invoke other methods on classes).

Big ball of mud
This indicates a software system that lacks a perceivable architecture. Although undesirable from a software engineering point of view, such systems are common in practice due to business pressures, developer turnover and code entropy. 

The term was popularized in Brian Foote and Joseph Yoder's 1997 paper of the same name, which defines the term:

Foote and Yoder have credited Brian Marick as the originator of the 'big ball of mud' term for this sort of architecture.

Project management anti-patterns 
Project management anti-patterns included in the Antipatterns book include Blowhard Jamboree (an excess of industry pundits), analysis paralysis, Viewgraph Engineering (too much time spent making presentations and not enough on the actual software), Death by Planning (similarly, too much planning), Fear of Success (irrational fears near to project completion), The Corncob (difficulties with people), Intellectual Violence (intimidation through use of jargon or arcane technology), Irrational Management (bad management habits), Smoke and Mirrors (excessive use of demos and prototypes by salespeople), Throw It Over the Wall (forcing fad software engineering practices onto developers without buy-in), Fire Drill (long periods of monotony punctuated by short crises), The Feud (conflicts between managers), and e-mail Is Dangerous (situations resulting from ill-advised e-mail messages).

See also 
Code smell – symptom of unsound programming
Design smell
Dark pattern
List of software development philosophies – approaches, styles, maxims and philosophies for software development
 List of tools for static code analysis
 Software rot
Software Peter principle
Capability Immaturity Model
ISO/IEC 29110: Software Life Cycle Profiles and Guidelines for Very Small Entities (VSEs)
The Innovator's Dilemma

References

What supports what

Sources

Further reading 
 
 Later re-printed in:

External links

Anti-pattern at WikiWikiWeb

 
Software architecture
Design
Industrial and organizational psychology
Organizational behavior
Anti-social behaviour
Workplace